Kipahigan Lake is a lake in western Manitoba, and eastern Saskatchewan, Canada, approximately 50 kilometres north of Flin Flon. The lake is in the Canadian Shield region of Canada.

On the Saskatchewan side of the lake there is a dam owned by the Saskatchewan Water Security Agency.

See also
List of dams and reservoirs in Canada
List of lakes of Saskatchewan
List of lakes of Manitoba
Hudson Bay drainage basin

References

Lakes of Manitoba
Borders of Manitoba
Borders of Saskatchewan
Lakes of Saskatchewan
Dams in Saskatchewan